The Royal Veterinary and Agricultural University (abbr. KVL) was a veterinary and agricultural science university in Denmark. It was founded in 1856 and operated until 2007, when it became a part of the University of Copenhagen. It had its headquarters in Frederiksberg, Copenhagen.

History

The university was founded in 1856. Its main building was inaugurated in 1858. The Royal Veterinarian School moved from Sankt Annæ Gade into the main building after its inauguration.

On January 1, 2007, the Royal Veterinary and Agricultural University was merged into the University of Copenhagen and was renamed as the Faculty of Life Sciences. This was later split up, with the veterinary part merging into the Faculty of Health and Medical Sciences and the rest merging into the Faculty of Science.

Locations

Main campus

The original three-winged main building (with the pergola) on Bülowsvej 17 was built between 1856 and 1858 and was designed by Gottlieb Bindesbøll. He also designed two detached wings that were built on Grønnegårdsvej. In 1895, the main building was expanded with a fourth wing (designed by Johannes Emil Gnudtzmann) and a central courtyard.

As of January 2007, the area is part of the University of Copenhagen's Frederiksberg Campus.

Other
The Royal Veterinary and Agricultural University established the Hørsholm Arboretum in 1936 as an off-site expansion of the Forestry Botanical Garden in Charlottenlund.

List of notable people

Alumni
 Werner Hosewinckel Christie (1877–1927)
 Svend O. Heiberg (1900–1965)
 Johannes Larsen Flatla (1906–1973)
 Steen Willadsen (1943–)
 Gábor Vajta (1952–)
 Mette Gjerskov (1966–)

Faculty
 Johan Lange (1818–1898)
 Niels Fjord (1825–1891)
 Emil Rostrup (1831–1907)
 Bernhard Bang (1848–1932)
 Peder Vilhelm Jensen-Klint (1853–1930)
 Wilhelm Johannsen (1857–1927)
 August Mentz (1867–1944)
 Carl Hansen Ostenfeld (1873–1931)
 Niels Bjerrum (1879–1958)
 Øjvind Winge (1886–1964)
 Jakob Nielsen (1890–1959)
 Jens Clausen (1891–1969)
 Thorvald Sørensen (1902–1973)

References

External links
 Buildings

Higher education in Copenhagen
Agricultural universities and colleges
Martin Borch buildings
Veterinary schools in Denmark